King OkaiKoi was a warrior king who formed the Akwashong, supreme military command, which provided the basis of renewal of Ga-Dangme military power.

History 
Okaikoi was the son of Mampong Okai and Dode Akabi. King Okaikoi signed a treaty with Denmark for a permanent trading post-fort Christiansborg on August 18, 1661. He ceded the beach of Osu to the Danes to start the building of the Christiansborg.

His own generals eventually betrayed him when they deserted him in a war against the Akwamus. Okaikoi cursed the deserters and blessed the loyal generals. After he finally took his own life. The death was the beginning of a period of uncertainty in Ga-Dangme history. Women and children, thousand of them were evacuated from Ayawaso because of his courage. His death marked the end of the Ayawaso period; majority of the Ga's retired to Ancho or Little Popo and the others resettled or joined kinsmen along the coastal strip. Trades were increasing with Europeans which had rendered the coast or Little Accra (Ga Mashi) attractive more than Ayawaso.

Prince Ashangmong continued a guerrilla warfare against the Akwamu driving them to Fanti. Prince Ashangmong was the son of Okai Yai, the brother of Okaikoi. The prince then retired with all the Ga from Labadi to Ningo to the Little Popo.

See also 

 Ga Mantse

References 

History of Ghana
People from Accra